Marie Yassi  (born 7 November 1985) is an Ivorian footballer who plays as a midfielder for the Ivory Coast women's national football team. She was part of the team at the 2014 African Women's Championship. On club level she played for Atlas 5 FC in Morocco.

See also

 2014 African Women's Championship squads
List of Ivory Coast women's international footballers

References

External links
 CAF player profile

1985 births
Living people
Place of birth missing (living people)
Ivorian women's footballers
Women's association football midfielders
Ivory Coast women's international footballers
Ivorian expatriate footballers
Ivorian expatriate sportspeople in Morocco
Expatriate footballers in Morocco